The Lady from Nowhere is a 1931 American crime film directed by Richard Thorpe and starring Alice Day, John Holland and Phillips Smalley.

Cast
 Alice Day as Marian  
 John Holland as John Conroy  
 Phillips Smalley as Barstow  
 Barbara Bedford as Mollie Carter  
 Mischa Auer as Rigo  
 James P. Burtis as Chief of Detectives  
 Bernie Lamont 
 Raymond Largay 
 Lafe McKee as Henchman Snowden

References

Bibliography
 Michael R. Pitts. Poverty Row Studios, 1929–1940: An Illustrated History of 55 Independent Film Companies, with a Filmography for Each. McFarland & Company, 2005.

External links
 

1931 films
1931 crime films
American crime films
Films directed by Richard Thorpe
Chesterfield Pictures films
American black-and-white films
1930s English-language films
1930s American films